Saintala railway station is a railway station on the East Coast Railway network in the state of Odisha, India. It serves Saintala town. Its code is SFC. It has two platforms. Passenger, Express and Superfast trains halt at Saintala railway station.

Major trains

 Puri–Durg Express
 Sambalpur–Rayagada Intercity Express
 Ispat Express
 Samaleshwari Express

See also
 Balangir district

References

Railway stations in Balangir district
Sambalpur railway division